H. nana may refer to:
 Hasemania nana, the silvertip tetra, a freshwater fish species native to blackwater rivers in Brazil
 Hemigrammocapoeta nana, a ray-finned fish species found in Israel, Jordan and Syria
 Homalopoma nana, a minute sea snail species
 Hoplocorypha nana, a praying mantis species found in Uganda and Zululand
 Hulsea nana, the dwarf alpinegold, a flowering plant species
 Hydnocarpus nana, a plant species endemic to Malaysia
 Hymenolepis nana, the dwarf tapeworm, a worm species

Synonyms
 Harmodia nana, a synonym for Hadena confusa, a moth species

See also
 Nana (disambiguation)